Perrotia malchus is a butterfly in the family Hesperiidae. It is found in northern and central Madagascar. The habitat consists of forests.

References

Butterflies described in 1879
Erionotini
Butterflies of Africa
Taxa named by Paul Mabille